Agnes of Montepulciano (28 January 1268 – 20 April 1317) was a Dominican prioress in medieval Tuscany, who was known as a miracle worker during her lifetime. She is honored as a saint by the Catholic Church.

Life
Agnes was born in 1268 into the noble Segni family in Gracciano,  a frazione of Montepulciano, then part of the Papal States. At the age of nine, she convinced her parents to allow her to enter a Franciscan monastery of women in the city known as the "Sisters of the Sack", after the rough religious habit they wore. They lived a simple contemplative life. She received the permission of the pope to be accepted into this life at such a young age, which was normally against Church law.

In 1281, the lord of the castle of Proceno, a fief of Orvieto, invited the nuns of Montepulciano to send some of their sisters to Proceno to found a new monastery. Agnes was among the nuns sent to found this new community.  At the age of fourteen she was appointed bursar.

In 1288 Agnes, despite her youth at only 20 years of age, was noted for her devotion to the Blessed Sacrament and deep life of prayer, and was elected as the prioress of the community.  There she gained a reputation for performing miracles; people suffering from mental and physical ailments seemed cured by her presence.  She was reported to have "multiplied loaves", creating many from a few on numerous occasions, recalling the Gospel miracle of the loaves and fishes. She herself, however, suffered severe bouts of illness which lasted long periods of time.

In 1306, Agnes was recalled to head the monastery in Montepulciano. Agnes reached a high degree of contemplative prayer and is said to have been favoured with many visions. After her return, she proceeded to build a church, Santa Maria Novella in Florence, to honour the Blessed Mother, as she felt she had been commanded to do in a mystical vision several years earlier.  She also had a vision of Dominic Guzman, under the inspiration of which she led the nuns of her monastery to embrace the Rule of St. Augustine as members of the Dominican Order.  She was frequently called upon to bring peace to the warring families of the city.

By 1316, Agnes' health had declined so greatly that her doctor suggested taking the cure at the thermal springs in the neighbouring town of Chianciano Terme. The nuns of the community prevailed upon her to take his recommendation. While many of the other bathers reported being cured of their illnesses, Agnes herself received no benefit from the springs.Yet,Her health failed to such a degree that she had to be carried back to the monastery on a stretcher.

Veneration
Agnes died the following 20 April, at the age of 49. The Dominican friars attempted to obtain balsam (or myrrh) to embalm her body. It was found, however, to be producing a sweet odor on its own, and her limbs remained supple. When her body was moved years after her death to the monastery church, it was found to be incorrupt. Her tomb became the site of pilgrimages.  

Some fifty years after her death, a Dominican friar, Raymond of Capua, who served as confessor to Catherine of Siena, wrote an account of Agnes' life. He described her body as still appearing as if she were alive. Catherine herself referred to her as "Our mother, the glorious Agnes". Catherine made a pilgrimage to Montepulciano while visiting her niece, Eugenie, who was a nun there. Another Dominican, Lorenzo Mariani of Rome, wrote another early biography of Agnes, in which he already referred to her as a saint.

In 1435  her remains were moved to the church of San Domenico, Orvieto. 

Agnes was canonized by Pope Benedict XIII in 1726. Her feast day is celebrated within the Dominican Order on 20 April. "In Montepulciano, Tuscany, St. Agnes, Virgin, of the Order of St. Dominic, noted for her miracles." – Roman Martyrology for April 20.

Agnes of Montepulciano is depicted as a Dominican nun with a cross or crucifix, lilies, and a lamb (a play upon the name "Agnes").

See also
The Incorruptibles

References

Saint Agnes of Montepulciano, patron saint archive

External links
Attwater, Donald and Catherine Rachel John. The Penguin Dictionary of Saints. 3rd edition. New York: Penguin Books, 1993. .

1268 births
1317 deaths
People from Montepulciano
Dominican nuns
Dominican saints
13th-century Italian Roman Catholic religious sisters and nuns
13th-century Christian saints
14th-century Christian saints
Incorrupt saints
Miracle workers
Christian female saints of the Middle Ages
14th-century Italian Roman Catholic religious sisters and nuns
Canonizations by Pope Benedict XIII